The Genesis G80 is an executive sedan manufactured by South Korean luxury marque Genesis, which is owned by Hyundai Motor Company. The G80 model was previously introduced as the second-generation Hyundai Genesis model (DH) and then rebranded as the G80 in 2016 after Genesis Motor was established as a separate luxury division of Hyundai.



First generation (DH; 2016) 

The vehicle debuted as the updated version of the Hyundai Genesis at the 2016 North American International Auto Show, followed by the 2016 Busan Motor Show. South Korean models went on sale in July 2016 with US models selling in September 2016 as a 2017 model year vehicle. Powertrains available included 3.8, 3.8 HTRAC, 5.0, and 5.0 HTRAC.  The Russian market release in 2017 included a 2.0-liter Theta turbocharged engine that produced , eight-speed automatic and all-wheel drive.

G80 Sport
The Genesis G80 Sport (2017-2020) has a twin-turbo 3.3-liter V6 engine producing , features sport-styled bumpers, quad-exhaust tips, staggered nineteen-inch wheels, copper tint accent chrome, copper leather stitching and a mesh grille. The vehicle also comes standard with the Ultimate trim, technology package, heads-up display, panoramic sunroof, suede liner and Napa leather. The vehicle debuted at the 2016 Busan Motor Show, followed by the 2016 Los Angeles Auto Show, and the 2017 North American International Auto Show. US models were sold as 2018, 2019, 2020 model year vehicles.

Engines

Transmission
All models have an eight-speed automatic transmission with shiftronic. The G80 is available with rear-wheel drive or all-wheel drive (HTRAC).

Safety

Second generation (RG3; 2020) 

The second-generation Genesis G80, codenamed RG3, was officially revealed via an online livestream on March 30, 2020, and went on sale in the US during the summer of that year. It is also considered the third-generation model of the original Hyundai Genesis as the first-generation G80 model was initially launched as the second-generation Hyundai Genesis model (DH) and later rebranded as the G80 in 2016 after Genesis Motor became a separate luxury division of Hyundai. There are three engine options – a 2.5-liter gasoline turbo engine, a 3.5-liter gasoline turbo engine, or a 2.2-liter diesel engine.

Electrified G80 
The Electrified G80 is the battery electric version of the G80. It debuted at the Shanghai Auto Show on 19 April 2021. It has been sold in South Korea since 2021.

It is available in a dual-motor, all-wheel drive configuration. It uses two electric motors (272 kW combined), one at each axle, and a 87.2 kWh battery. The vehicle can charge from 10% to 80% in 22 minutes, if a 350 kW charger is available. Just like the Ioniq 5, it has a vehicle-to-load (V2L) function, meaning that various appliances like laptops or electric bikes can be plugged into the car (instead of a wall socket) and use the car as their power source. The Electrified G80 can be equipped with an optional solar roof.

The interior contains recycled materials, including leather made with natural dye (seats, console and rear seat armrests), scrap wood produced after making furniture ("forged wood" garnish) and thread spun from plastic bottles. The Electrified G80 offers a Disconnector Actuator System (DAS), an Active Noise Control-Road (ANC-R) system, a Preview Electronic Control Suspension (Pre-view ECS), a solar charging roof, a Vehicle to Load (V2L) system and a 400/800V multi rapid charging system.

G80 Sport 
After the design release on July 5, 2021, the Genesis G80 Sport was released on August 10, 2021. This model introduced redesigned grills, bumpers, headlamps and wheels compared to the non-Sport model. A Cavendish Red paint color is exclusive for the G80 sports model. Two gasoline engines and a diesel are available.

The G80 Sport is also equipped with Rear Wheel Steering (RWS) system, a technology that actively controls the optimal rear-wheel steering angle along with front-wheel steering.

Powertrain

Safety

Production
The Genesis G80 is manufactured in Ulsan, Korea. Between 2015 and 2018 worldwide sales of the G80 were 127,283. Hyundai Motor America sold 6,166 units in 2016, 16,214 units in 2017, and 7,663 units in 2018 in the United States. Hyundai attributes flagging US sales in 2018 to disagreements among its dealership networks that caused deliberate dwindling supplies, not on reduced consumer demand.

Marketing
During the 2017 NFL Pro Bowl, Genesis G80 sedans were awarded to offensive and defensive "most valuable players."

Awards
 2017 International Design Excellence Award (IDEA), finalist
 2017–2021 Insurance Institute for Highway Safety (IIHS), Top Safety Pick Plus
 2019 Women's Choice Award, Best Luxury Sedan Under $50,000 for Reliability and Overall
 2020 J.D. Power U.S. Vehicle Dependability Study, Most Dependable Midsize Premium Car

Sales

Notes

References

External links

 

G80
Cars introduced in 2016
2020s cars
Executive cars
Sports sedans
Production electric cars
Rear-wheel-drive vehicles
All-wheel-drive vehicles